Po is a generic term referring to an outer robe or overcoat. There are two general types of po, the Korean type and the Chinese type.

The Korean type is a common style from the Three Kingdoms of Korea period, and it is used in modern day. A belt was used until it was replaced by a ribbon during late Joseon dynasty. Durumagi is a variety of po that was worn as protection against cold. It had been widely worn as an outer robe over jeogori and baji. It is also called jumagui, juchaui, or juui.

Starting from North-South states period, they were used through history until nation-wide adoption of the Korean type durumagi in 1895.

Types 

 Changeui (창의, 氅衣)
Cheollik 
Danryeongpo (단령포/團領袍) – a type of round collar robe, worn by men and women.
Dapho – a short sleeved overcoat.
 Dopo (도포/道袍) – a type of cross-collar robe worn by the seonbi and the noblemen.
 Durumagi (두루마기/周衣/周莫衣)
Goryeongpo – Korean term for the Dragon robe.
 Jang-ot (장옷/長衣) – a representative overcoat form women in early Joseon; it later became a form of headdress.
 Jangsam (장삼/長衫)
 Jikryunpo (直領袍) – a robe with a straight neckline.

Gallery

See also
Durumagi
Hanbok
Jeogori
Jeonbok
Sagyusam

References

 Alt URL

Korean clothing